Moral is a 1928 German silent comedy film directed by Willi Wolff and starring Ellen Richter, Ralph Arthur Roberts and Jakob Tiedtke. It was shot at the EFA Studios in Berlin. The film's art direction was by Ernst Stern. It was released by the German subsidiary of Universal Pictures.

Cast
 Ellen Richter as Ninon de Hauteville  
 Ralph Arthur Roberts as Prof. Wasner  
 Jakob Tiedtke as Rentier Beermann  
 Fritz Greiner as Justizrat Hauser  
 Julius Falkenstein as Fürst Emil von Gerolstein 
 Harry Halm as Erbprinz  
 Ferdinand von Alten as Kammerherr von Schmettau  
 Paul Graetz as Polizeischreiber Reisacher  
 Albert Paulig as Assessor Ströbel  
 Hilde Jennings as Elfie Beermann  
 Ernst Hofmann as Dobler 
 Paul Morgan as Mitglied des Sittlichkeitsvereins 
 Fritz Beckmann as Mitglied des Sittlichkeitsvereins  
 Hugo Döblin as Mitglied des Sittlichkeitsvereins  
 Robert Garrison 
 Heinrich Gotho 
 Karl Harbacher as Mitglied des Sittlichkeitsvereins  
 Julius E. Herrmann as Mitglied des Sittlichkeitsvereins  
 Alice Torning

References

Bibliography
 Goble, Alan. The Complete Index to Literary Sources in Film. Walter de Gruyter, 1999.

External links

1928 films
Films of the Weimar Republic
Films directed by Willi Wolff
German silent feature films
Films based on German novels
German black-and-white films
Films shot at Halensee Studios
German comedy films
1928 comedy films
Universal Pictures films
1920s German films